Donald Lon Munro (July 14, 1857 – September 29, 1919) was an American politician from Pennsylvania. In 1908, Munro was the vice-presidential nominee of the Socialist Labor Party of America. He was the running mate of August Gillhaus of New York. The pair were on 15 state ballots and received 14,031 votes.

Prior to running for vice-president, Munro was the SLP nominee in Pennsylvania for Supreme Court Judge. He was from coal mining town of DuBois, Pennsylvania.

References

Socialist Labor Party of America politicians from Pennsylvania
Socialist Labor Party of America vice presidential nominees
1908 United States vice-presidential candidates
People from DuBois, Pennsylvania
1857 births
1919 deaths